Gråkjær Arena is a sports center in Holstebro, Denmark. It has room for 3,250 spectators and is used primarily as home of the handball club Team Tvis Holstebro.

History
On 10 November 2009 did the former mayor Arne Lægaard, the former culture and leisure department chairman HC Østerby and handball players Lars Rasmussen and Kristina Kristiansen broke ground and topping-out ceremony was 23 June 2010. The hall was inaugurated 2 February 2011 with a match in the women's handball league between Team Tvis Holstebro and Viborg HK. The arena cost 55 million kroner to build

External links
Official website

Handball venues in Denmark
Holstebro
Indoor arenas in Denmark